When You Come Back to Me may refer to:

 When You Come Back to Me (film), a 1953 drama film
 "When You Come Back to Me" (Edyta Górniak song), 1997
 "When You Come Back to Me" (Jason Donovan song), 1989
 "When You Come Back to Me", a 1950 song by the Clovers
 "When You Come Back to Me", a song by World Party from the soundtrack to the 1994 film Reality Bites